KXJK (950 AM) is a radio station licensed to serve Forrest City, Arkansas, United States.  The station, established in 1949, is owned and operated by the Forrest City Broadcasting Company.

FM Translator
In addition to the main station on 950 MHz, the KXJK signal is relayed to an FM translator, which provides both High fidelity sound and the option of FM to listeners.

Programming
KXJK broadcasts a mixed format and features programming from USA Radio News, Premiere Networks, Westwood One and SportsMap Radio. KXJK airs regional and local news as well as a morning show in simulcast with sister station KBFC. KXJK broadcasts Arkansas Razorbacks baseball.

KXJK also features gospel programming on Sunday Mornings, as well as Monday and Wednesday evenings.

On December 28th, 2020, KXJK began broadcasting on the HD2 Channel of KBFC.

History
This station began broadcast operations in 1949.

Staff
General Manager: Rob Johnson
Asst. Manager/Sports Manager: Richard Benson
News Director: Rick Holt
Administrative Assistant: Berta McMahon
Engineer: Palmer Johnson
On Air Personality: Miles J. Kimble
On Air Personality: Lamont Swanigan
On Air Personality: J. Fred Houston

External links

Radio Locator Information for K293BS

XJK
Classic hits radio stations in the United States
Radio stations established in 1949
1949 establishments in Arkansas
Forrest City, Arkansas